Martin Schützenauer (born 28 June 1962 in Vienna) is an Austrian bobsledder and athlete who competed from the early 1990s to the early 2000s (decade).

He won a silver medal in the four-man event at the 1995 FIBT World Championships in Winterberg.

Competing in four Winter Olympics, and two (Summer Olympics)  Schützenauer earned his best finish of sixth in the four-man event at Lillehammer in 1994.

References
Bobsleigh four-man world championship medalists since 1930
1994 bobsleigh four-man results
1998 bobsleigh four-man results
2002 bobsleigh two-man results

1962 births
Living people
Athletes from Vienna
Austrian male bobsledders
Austrian male sprinters
Olympic bobsledders of Austria
Olympic athletes of Austria
Bobsledders at the 1992 Winter Olympics
Bobsledders at the 1994 Winter Olympics
Bobsledders at the 1998 Winter Olympics
Bobsledders at the 2002 Winter Olympics
Athletes (track and field) at the 1996 Summer Olympics